Events in the year 2018 in the United Arab Emirates.

Incumbents
 President: Khalifa bin Zayed Al Nahyan
 Prime Minister: Mohammed bin Rashid Al Maktoum

Events
5 May - Briton Matthew Hedges is arrested in the United Arab Emirates on suspicion of spying. He is later sentenced to life imprisonment.
22 June - 2018 Dubai Kabaddi Masters is an upcoming international kabaddi sporting event to be held in Dubai. This event also marks the first ever international kabaddi tournament to be held in the United Arab Emirates.

Deaths

28 January – Hassa bint Mohammed bin Khalifa Al Nahyan, royal.
27 July – Ousha the Poet, poet (b. 1920).

References

 
2010s in the United Arab Emirates
Years of the 21st century in the United Arab Emirates
United Arab Emirates
United Arab Emirates